Duncan McDuffie (September 24, 1877 – 1951) was a real estate developer, conservationist, and mountaineer based in Berkeley, California, United States.

Developer
McDuffie is best known for developing the Claremont and Northbrae neighborhoods of Berkeley and St. Francis Wood district in San Francisco. His upscale developments were laid out as "residential parks," with streets following the contours of hills and underground power lines. His developments included racial covenants to exclude non-whites from home ownership, and he also promoted single-family zoning laws to exclude non-whites.

Conservationist
McDuffie was a notable conservationist, and was president of the Sierra Club from 1928 to 1931 and 1943–1946.

East Bay Regional Park District
In 1934 McDuffie helped create the East Bay Regional Park District in the Berkeley Hills.

California state parks
McDuffie helped establish the California state park system with the help of his friend Governor C. C. Young. He won the Pugsley Medal for his service on the California State Parks Commission.

Mountaineer
McDuffie was an accomplished mountaineer in the Sierra Nevada, and made first ascents of Mount Abbot and Black Kaweah.

Along with Joseph N. LeConte and James S. Hutchinson, he pioneered a high mountain route in 1908 from Yosemite National Park to Kings Canyon, roughly along the route of the modern John Muir Trail. In 28 days, they completed a trip of 228 miles through the high mountains, including several previously unexplored sections.

McDuffie suffered from Parkinson's disease for nearly 20 years before his death in 1951. The Sierra peak Mount McDuffie is named after him.

References

External links and sources 
 Duncan McDuffie: Cornelius Amory Pugsley Silver Medal Award, 1928
 History of Mason-McDuffie website
  SIGNATURE STYLE: Duncan McDuffie - Natural neighborhoods: Visionary developer created elegant urban 'residential parks', San Francisco Chronicle, Dave Weinstein, February 7, 2004

Sierra Club directors
American mountain climbers
Architects from California
Businesspeople from California
Real estate and property developers
Businesspeople from Berkeley, California
1877 births
1951 deaths
People with Parkinson's disease